Oklahoma School for the Deaf (OSD) is a public residential school for the deaf and hard of hearing students ages 2 through 18. The school teaches K-12 students in Sulphur, Oklahoma, United States.

History

The first school in what would later become the state of Oklahoma to give instruction to deaf children was at Fort Gibson.This school, started by a Mrs. Lowery, provided for the education of blind Indian children of the Five Civilized Tribes. Later, deaf children were admitted. In 1898, Mr. and Mrs. Ellsworth Long started a school for deaf children in Guthrie, then the capital of Oklahoma Territory. After the two territories merged to become the state of Oklahoma, in 1907, the Oklahoma School for the Deaf (OSD) was established in Sulphur, Oklahoma. In 1908, classes were held in rented buildings and hotels in the Sulphur business district.  Edna Patch was the first graduate of this school in Oklahoma, class of 1907. She later became the first deaf employee of the Oklahoma School for the Deaf.

Construction of new school buildings began in 1910. In 1911, the buildings under construction (about a quarter of a mile east and 100 yards south of the present location) fell in. With allegations of fraud, the buildings were condemned. (The original cornerstone was found, purchased, and donated to the school by Thomas Thompson, Betty Stephens, and Larry Hawkins.) Replacement buildings were begun at the present location in 1912 and the first classes were held in the fall of 1913.

OSD has grown from the original three buildings (Ralph H. White Education Center, Stewart Hall, and Read Hall) to a campus that includes the gym, auditorium, student union complex, superintendent's residence, Long Hall, Blattner Hall, Vocational Building, Griffing Hall, and the Physical Plant facilities.

In 1961, a major renovation was begun on all OSD buildings. Renovations were completed in 1980. In 1999–2000, a new renovation project was begun. By 2002, Long Hall, White Hall, Stewart Hall, and Blattner Hall were completed. Major repairs have been made to the gymnasium during this period.

Outreach program

The outreach program provides evaluations to children from age two to 21, in-service training programs, and consultation for adaptations and modifications to the children's education environments. OSD provided 2,506 direct services to deaf or hearing-impaired students and 14,847 contacts of families, schools, and hearing impaired organizations.

Funding

95% of OSD's budget is funded by state appropriations. The school receives IDEA-B funds through the State Department of Education for the students who are residential, and the IDEA funds for day students are kept by the school district where the child lives.  The school receives small amounts of funding through Child Nutrition, Career Technology and the Department of Libraries, as well as Medicaid reimbursement for eligible children.  The school does not regularly receive any other federal education funding.  All of the federal funding received is discretionary and cannot be considered ongoing revenues.

Facilities
The school has a dormitory.

Projects

The School for the Deaf partnered with the State Department of Education on two major projects. The first program, ECCO (Enriching Children's Communication Opportunities), is an early intervention program designed to work with parents of deaf children ages 3 to 6. The second project is a teaching and mentoring program to increase the sign proficiency levels of education interpreters in public schools.

OSD will continue its emphasis on literacy and math, demonstrating at least a one year's growth annually. Since February 2007, OSD's Captioned Film Library became the National Accessible Learning Center (NALC) which is the sole distributor of "Described and Captioned Media Program" media in the United States.

OSD plans to increase outreach services to students and adults through the programs at OSD.  Examples include the ECCO program designed to help parents of young deaf children; the telecommunication distribution program for deaf, hard-of-hearing, and speech-impaired individuals; the senior citizen's and the children's hearing aid programs.

In 2011, the school undertook a fundraising campaign to upgrade and provide lights and bleachers for its rudimentary football stadium.

Parent agency
The Oklahoma Department of Rehabilitation Services is the parent agency for the Oklahoma School for the Deaf.

Notes

References

External links

 

Schools for the deaf in the United States
Public education in Oklahoma
Public high schools in Oklahoma
Public middle schools in Oklahoma
Public elementary schools in Oklahoma
Public K-12 schools in the United States
Public boarding schools in the United States
Boarding schools in Oklahoma
Schools in Murray County, Oklahoma
Educational institutions established in 1907
1907 establishments in Oklahoma